Waldeyer's tonsillar ring (pharyngeal lymphoid ring, Waldeyer's lymphatic ring, or tonsillar ring) is a ringed arrangement of lymphoid organs in the pharynx. Waldeyer's ring surrounds the naso- and oropharynx, with some of its tonsillar tissue located above and some below the soft palate (and to the back of the mouth cavity).

Structure
The ring consists of the (from top to bottom):
 1 pharyngeal tonsil (or "adenoid"), located on the roof of the nasopharynx, under the sphenoid bone.
 2 tubal tonsils on each side, where each auditory tube opens into the nasopharynx
 2 palatine tonsils (commonly called "the tonsils") located in the oropharynx
lingual tonsils, a collection of lymphatic tissue located on the back part of the tongue

Terminology
Some authors speak of two pharyngeal tonsils/two adenoids. These authors simply look at the left and right halves of the pharyngeal tonsil as two tonsils. Many authors also speak of lingual tonsils (in the plural), because this accumulation of lymphoid tissue consists of a number of little prominences – many smaller rounded masses. Whether to collectively call all these a single tonsil or separate tonsils is to an extent an arbitrary decision.

Variation
There also normally is a good amount of mucosa-associated lymphoid tissue (MALT) present between all these tonsils (intertonsillar) around the ring, and more of this lymphoid tissue can variably be found more or less throughout at least the naso- and oropharynx.

Development
The tubal tonsils usually develops from an accumulation of lymphoid tissue in the pharyngeal tonsil.

Clinical significance
The palatine tonsils when inflamed/swollen, more common in children, can obstruct respiration.

Inflammation of the tonsils is called tonsillitis and removal is called tonsillectomy.

Etymology of Waldeyer’s ring
Waldeyer's ring was named after the nineteenth-century German anatomist Heinrich Wilhelm Gottfried von Waldeyer-Hartz.

Other animals
Some animals, but not humans, have one or two additional tonsils:
 Soft palate tonsil
 Paraepiglottic tonsil

References

Lymphatics of the head and neck
Tonsil
Lymphoid organ
Pharynx